American rapper Red Café has released one extended play (EP), eleven mixtapes and twelve singles.

Albums

Collaboration albums

EPs

Mixtapes

Singles

Promotional singles

Collaboration singles

Featured singles

Other charted songs

Guest appearances

References

External links
 

Discographies of American artists
Hip hop discographies